The Nature Discovery Centre is a   nature reserve in Thatcham in Berkshire. It is managed by the Berkshire, Buckinghamshire and Oxfordshire Wildlife Trust.

This site has a variety of habitats including a lake, woodland, reedbeds and hedges. The lake has many wintering wildfowl such as shovelers and pochrds. Invertebrates include the bloody-nosed and rhinoceros beetles.

The centre has toilets, a cafe, a shop, bird hides and a visitor centre.

References

External links 

Berkshire, Buckinghamshire and Oxfordshire Wildlife Trust
Kennet and Avon Canal
Nature centres in England
Nature reserves in Berkshire
Tourist attractions in Berkshire
Protected areas of Berkshire
West Berkshire District
Thatcham